Jhonny is a given name, which is an alternate spelling of Johnny. Notable people with the name include:

Jhonny Acosta
Jhony Rios
Jhonny Arteaga
Jhonny Bravo
Jhonny Cubero
Jhonny González
Jhonny Haikella Hakaye
Jhonny Núñez
Jhonny Peralta
Jhonny da Silva
Jhonny Vidales

See also 
 
 
Jhoneil Centeno
Jhoni Marchinko
Jhonnier Gonzalez
Jhony (Jesucristo Esthil Kote López)
Jhony Obeso
Jhony Peralta
Jhon (disambiguation)
 Alternate forms for the name John